The 1984–85 1. Slovenská národná hokejová liga season was the 16th season of the 1. Slovenská národná hokejová liga, the second level of ice hockey in Czechoslovakia alongside the 1. Česká národní hokejová liga. 10 teams participated in the league, and PS Poprad won the championship. Slávia Ekonóm Bratislava was relegated.

Regular season

References

External links
 Season  on avlh.sweb.cz (PDF)
 Season on hokejpoprad.sk

Czech
1st. Slovak National Hockey League seasons
2